Troy Edward Verzosa Rike  is a Filipino-American professional basketball player for the NorthPort Batang Pier of Philippine Basketball Association (PBA). He played college basketball for four seasons with Wake Forest, before transferring to National University.

High school and college career

St. Ignatius College Preparatory 
Rike played for St. Ignatius College Preparatory in California. Aside from basketball, he was also on the crew/rowing team.

Wake Forest 
Rike joined the Wake Forest Demon Deacons in 2014 via walk-on. Over his four seasons there, he only appeared in 23 games.

National University 
Rike announced on Twitter that he would be joining the NU Bulldogs for Season 81. He was eligible to play that season without red-shirting because he was a graduate student at the time. He debuted with six points and seven rebounds in 15 minutes. On August 26, 2018, he was arrested and detained against his will by agents of the Bureau of Immigration (BI) over questions about his nationality. He was released after more than 24 hours. In his final game with NU, he had 17 points and 13 rebounds.

Professional career

FIBA 3x3 Pro Circuit and Chooks-to-Go Pilipinas 3x3 (2019–20) 
Rike played for the Pasig Grindhouse Kings, beginning in the inaugural leg of Chooks-to-Go Pilipinas 3x3. His team claimed the President's Cup. Then, they competed in the 2019 Kunshan Challenger, but were eliminated early. They also made the semifinals of the Chooks-to-Go Asia Pacific Super Quest.

For the Patriot's Cup, Rike played for Phenom-Basilan Steel. They upset Wilkins-Balanga Pure, 21–20 in the Finals, making them champions and qualifying them for the 2019 FIBA 3x3 Jeddah Masters.

Rike returned to playing for Pasig for the FIBA 3x3 Xiong An Challenger. At the end of the season, he initially thought about getting drafted into the PBA, but then had a change of heart and withdrew his name from the 2019 PBA draft. 

In the 2020 President's Cup, he played for Zamboanga Chooks-to-Go. Again, his team claimed the President's Cup. He finished his 3x3 career as the no. 5 player in the country.

NorthPort Batang Pier (2021–present) 
After two years in the 3x3 circuit, Rike declared for the 2020 PBA Draft. He was drafted by the NorthPort Batang Pier with the 11th pick. He was signed to a two-year contract. In the 2021 Philippine Cup, he had a career-high 20 points on six threes, along with eight rebounds and three blocks, which came in NorthPort's win over the Phoenix Super LPG Fuel Masters.

Rike was not able to play in the 2022 Philippine Cup due to him taking a leave of absence.

Career statistics

PBA 

As of the end of 2021 Season

Season-by-season averages 

|-
| align=left | 
| align=left | NorthPort
| 24 || 13.6 || .457 || .432 || .500 || 2.7 || .3 || .2 || .3 || 3.8
|-class=sortbottom
| align=center colspan=2 | Career
| 24 || 13.6 || .457 || .432 || .500 || 2.7 || .3 || .2 || .3 || 3.8

NCAA 

|-
| align="left" | 2014–15
| align="left" rowspan="4" | Wake Forest University
| 4 || 0 || 1.5 || .000 || .000 || .500 || .5 || .3 || .0 || .0 || 0.3
|-
| align="left" | 2015–16
| 5 || 0 || 1.4 || .500 || .000 || .000 || 1.2 || .0 || .0 || .0 || 0.4
|-
| align="left" | 2016–17
| 5 || 0 || 1.2 || 1.000 || .000 || .000 || .8 || .0 || .0 || .0 || 0.4
|-
| align="left" | 2017–18
| 9 || 1 || 1.3 || .429 || .000 || .706 || .0 || .1 || .0 || .0 || 0.8
|- class="sortbottom"
| style="text-align:center;" colspan="2"| Career
| 23 || 1 || 1.3 || .455 || .333 || .333 || .5 || .1 || .0 || .0 || 0.5

National team career 
Rike was named to the "23-for-2023" pool, which was composed of young players for the 2023 FIBA World Cup. Along with other Gilas Cadets, he played in the 2018 FilOil Preseason Cup.

Rike also played a part in the Philippines–Australia brawl, as he protected Australian player Chris Goulding from further attacks. For his actions, he was awarded a cash incentive, but he gave it to charity.

In 2019, he represented the Philippines in the Jakarta 3x3 International Invitational Challenge. The next year, he was a member of the team that competed in the 2020 Fiba 3x3 World Tour Doha Masters.

Personal life 
Rike's mother, Veronica Verzosa, used to play collegiate tennis for the University of San Francisco. He also has a younger brother and sister.

Notes

References

External links 
 PBA.ph profile
 Wake Forest Demon Deacons bio
 Troy Rike on Twitter

1995 births
Living people
American sportspeople of Filipino descent
Basketball players from San Francisco
Citizens of the Philippines through descent
Centers (basketball)
FIBA 3x3 World Tour players
Filipino men's 3x3 basketball players
Filipino men's basketball players
NorthPort Batang Pier draft picks
NorthPort Batang Pier players
NU Bulldogs basketball players
Power forwards (basketball)
Wake Forest Demon Deacons men's basketball players